The 1908 German football championship, the sixth edition of the competition, was won by Viktoria 89 Berlin, defeating Stuttgarter Kickers 3–1 in the final.

For Viktoria 89 Berlin it was the first national title, having lost the previous season's final to Freiburger FC. The club would make another losing appearance in the final in the following season before winning its second title in 1911. For the Stuttgarter Kickers it was the club's sole appearance in the championship final.

Viktoria's Willi Worpitzky was the top scorers of the 1908 championship with six goals.

Eight clubs qualified for the competition played in knock-out format, the champions of each of the seven regional football championships and the defending German champions.

Qualified teams
The teams qualified through the regional championships:

Competition

Quarter-finals
The quarter-finals, played on 3 May 1908, with the replay played on 17 May:

|}
1 declared void.

Replay

|}

Semi-finals
The semi-finals, played on 17 and 24 May 1908:

|}

Final

References

Sources
 kicker Allmanach 1990, by kicker, page 160 to 178 – German championship
 Süddeutschlands Fussballgeschichte in Tabellenform 1897-1988  History of Southern German football in tables, publisher & author: Ludolf Hyll

External links
 German Championship 1907–08 at weltfussball.de 
 German Championship 1908 at RSSSF

German football championship seasons
1
German